Sutrula is a 2014 Indian Tamil-language thriller film written and directed by V. Rajesh Alfred. The film features Richard Rishi, Mithun, Srija, Prajin, Sandra Amy, and Ankitha. The music was composed by Bharani with editing by G. Sasikumar and cinematography by Ravisamy. The film released on 19 December 2014.

Cast
Richard Rishi as Johnny 
Mithun as Mahesh
Srija as Deepa
Prajin
Ankitha
Singamuthu
Sandra Amy as Sandra (guest appearance)

Production
The project began production in late 2012 with  businessman Venkatraman and Ravikumar opting to fund Rajesh Alfred's first script. The team primarily shot scenes across Ooty, using an old palace at a cost of 1 lakh per day. A 75 schedule was also held in forests in early 2013, with Richard revealed to play a negative role. The team held their music release function in April 2013, with Sarath Kumar and R. B. Choudary attending as chief guests.

Despite completing production in early 2013, the film was delayed for almost a year, before the team geared up for a theatrical release in late 2014. For promotional purposes, the team hired out jeeps featuring a doll, a pivotal character in the film, and rode around the streets of Tamil Nadu.

Soundtrack

Release
The film was released across Tamil Nadu on 19 December 2014 alongside Mysskin's Pisasu (2014). The film opened to mixed reviews, with a critic from The Hindu stating the film "doesn’t respect your intelligence" referring to one scene. Thinathanthi and other Tamil daily papers of TN highly appreciated this movie for its making and interesting thrilling scenes!

References

2014 films
Films shot in India
2010s Tamil-language films